Kevin Nathaniel House (born December 20, 1957 in St. Louis, Missouri) is a former professional American football player who was selected by the Tampa Bay Buccaneers in the second round of the 1980 NFL Draft. A 6'1", 175 lbs. wide receiver from Southern Illinois University, House played in eight NFL seasons from 1980 to 1987 for the Buccaneers and Los Angeles Rams

Life after football
After his retirement from professional football, House opened and operated a hair salon. After selling the salon, he worked as a recruiter for T-Mobile and then worked for Bank of America. He is now retired.

References

1957 births
Living people
American football wide receivers
Southern Illinois Salukis football players
Tampa Bay Buccaneers players
Los Angeles Rams players
African-American players of American football
Players of American football from St. Louis
21st-century African-American people
20th-century African-American sportspeople